Tantoo Cardinal CM (born Rose Marie Cardinal; July 20, 1950) is a Canadian actress of Cree and Métis heritage. In 2009, she was made a member of the Order of Canada "for her contributions to the growth and development of Aboriginal performing arts in Canada, as a screen and stage actress, and as a founding member of the Saskatchewan Native Theatre Company."

Early life
Rose Marie "Tantoo" Cardinal was born the youngest of three children to Julia Cardinal, a woman of Cree and Métis descent.

Cardinal was raised in the hamlet of Anzac, Alberta. The lack of electricity inspired her to use her imagination while playing in the bush. Her grandmother nicknamed her "Tantoo" after the insect repellent they used while picking blueberries together. She taught Cardinal the Cree language, the traditional ways of their culture and the difficulties she would face growing up Métis in Canada. Cardinal has said that it was walking behind her grandmother where she first learned to act.

Career
Cardinal has played roles in many notable films and television series, including Spirit Bay, Loyalties, Dances with Wolves, Black Robe, Legends of the Fall, Smoke Signals, Hold the Dark and North of 60. She was cast in the Canadian Broadcasting Corporation mini-series By Way of the Stars with Gordon Tootoosis as the Cree Chief and Eric Schweig as Black Thunder.

In 2009, she was made a member of the Order of Canada "for her contributions to the growth and development of Aboriginal performing arts in Canada, as a screen and stage actress, and as a founding member of the Saskatchewan Native Theatre Company".

On August 23, 2011, Cardinal, Margot Kidder, and dozens of others were arrested while protesting the proposed extension of the Keystone Pipeline.

In 2012, she performed the role of Regan in an all-aboriginal production of William Shakespeare's King Lear at the National Arts Centre in Ottawa, alongside a cast that also included August Schellenberg as Lear, Billy Merasty as Gloucester, Jani Lauzon in a dual role as Cordelia and the Fool, and Craig Lauzon as Kent.

In 2017, she was named the winner of the Academy of Canadian Cinema and Television's Earle Grey Award for lifetime achievement.

In the 2018 film The Grizzlies, she plays a high school principal who is skeptical a first-time teacher can address social issues in the northwestern Nunavut community of Kugluktuk.

On November 26, 2021, along with other laureates, she received the "Governor General's Performing Arts Awards after a nearly two-year delay due to the COVID-19 pandemic".

Personal life
Cardinal met her first husband, Fred Martin, while boarding at his family's home during her high school years in Edmonton. They were married from 1968 to 1978 and had a son, Cheyenne, prior to their divorce.

She had her second son, Clifford, with actor Beaver Richards.

From 1988 to 2000, Cardinal was married to actor John Lawlor, with whom she had a daughter, Riel.

Filmography

Film

Television

Audiobooks

Music videos

See also
Notable Aboriginal people of Canada

References

External links
 
 Canadian Film Encyclopedia [A publication of the Film Reference Library/a division of the Toronto International Film Festival Group]

1950 births
Actresses from Alberta
Canadian film actresses
Canadian stage actresses
Canadian television actresses
Cree people
First Nations actresses
Living people
Members of the Order of Canada
People from Fort McMurray
20th-century Canadian actresses
21st-century Canadian actresses
20th-century First Nations people
21st-century First Nations people
Indspire Awards
Canadian Métis people